Interstate 26 (I-26) is a South Carolina Interstate highway running generally east–west from near Landrum, in Spartanburg County, to U.S. Route 17 (US 17), in Charleston, South Carolina. It is also the longest Interstate Highway in South Carolina.

Route description
I-26 runs  through South Carolina. Milemarkers run from west (north) to east (south). Milemarker 0 is in the mountains at the North Carolina state line. The last exit, at US 17 south of Charleston, is exit 221.

I-26 runs between the Broad and Saluda Rivers, descending from the mountains to the piedmont or midlands. At Columbia, I-126 crosses the confluence of the Broad and Saluda, which together form the Congaree, near the Columbia Canal and water treatment plant. I-26 continues following the Congaree until it hops south over into the Cooper and Ashley Drainage, then down to the coast.

I-26 is predominantly a four-lane rural Interstate with  speed limits. In the Columbia and Charleston areas, the Interstate widens to six lanes, but speeds are lower.

I-26 enters South Carolina just northeast of Landrum, traveling a southeasterly direction. The first major city along its route is Spartanburg, where it intersects I-85 to Greenville and Charlotte. As the Interstate weaves along the terrain, it reaches Clinton; where westbound travelers can connect with I-385 toward Greenville. Traveling through the Sumter National Forest, it connects with Newberry before entering the Midlands. At Columbia in a section known as "Malfunction Junction", it connects with I-20 to Augusta and Florence and I-126 toward the downtown area; it then goes south over the Saluda River and into Lexington County for the second of eventually four times along its course. At Cayce, it connects with I-77 to Charlotte. South of Cayce, the Interstate goes up and down a few very long hills before reaching the outskirts of Orangeburg and I-95 to Savannah and Florence. As it enters the relatively flat plains of the Lowcountry, the area becomes urbanized as the Interstate encroaches upon North Charleston and Charleston. As the Interstate curves through the peninsula formed by the Ashley and Cooper rivers, it connects with I-526 to Savannah and Mount Pleasant. Near the end, it overlaps with US 17 from its new interchange (from the Arthur Ravenel Jr. Bridge) to where the old interchange remnants and where I-26 ends (formally where the John P. Grace Memorial Bridge and Silas N. Pearman Bridge connected).

Services
The South Carolina Department of Transportation (SCDOT) operates and maintains one welcome center and seven rest areas along I-26. Welcome centers, which have a travel information facility on site, are located at milemarker 3 (eastbound); rest areas are located at milemarkers 63 (east and westbound), 123 (east and westbound), 150 (eastbound), 152 (westbound), and 204 (eastbound). Common at all locations are public restrooms, public telephones, vending machines, picnic area, and barbecue grills.

The South Carolina Department of Public Safety (SCDPS) and State Transport Police (STP) operates and maintains three truck inspection/weigh stations.

History

Construction of I-26 began in 1957 in the Columbia area with the  section from the Broad River to near Irmo. The  section of I-26 from I-126/US 76 in Columbia to US 176 at exit 97 was the first section of the highway to open up to traffic (on September 7, 1960). The  section from South Carolina Highway 210 (SC 210) to US 15 opened in September 1962. Construction proceeded in stages heading both west up toward Greenville and east toward Charleston. The highway was largely completed from Columbia to North Charleston by 1964; the section from Aviation Avenue to the highway's terminus at US 17 in downtown Charleston progressed more slowly due to land takings for the right-of-way and numerous bridges and viaducts that had to be built. The entire  of I-26 were completed by February 1969.

In the 1980s–1990s, I-26 around Columbia was widened from four to six lanes. In the mid-1990s, the North Charleston area was also widened from four to six lanes, part of which was further widened to eight lanes in the early 2010s. In 2005, the US 17 was realigned to a new interchange with I-26 at exit 220 from exit 221; the old interchange was mostly torn down and reconfigured, leaving the I-26 viaduct eastbound offramp and westbound onramps with US 17 south. In the mid-2010s, I-26 was widened southeast of Columbia from I-77 to Old Sandy Run Road. Starting in 2019 or 2020, a long stretch of I-26 northwest of Columbia will begin widening construction from four to six lanes from SC 202 at Little Mountain to US 76/US 176 at Irmo.

In 2011, a plan to add a lane in each direction between Broad River Road and Saint Andrews Road through "Malfunction Junction" had $8.5 million (equivalent to $ million in ) in funding but was expected to start sometime after 2012 and take two years.

On October 5, 2016, I-26 had all lanes converted to westbound only, from I-77 to I-526, due to Hurricane Matthew. This was done again on September 11, 2018, due to Hurricane Florence, and in September 2019 for Hurricane Dorian.

On November 19, 2016, construction began in Charleston to demolish, reconfigure, and replace exits 217 and 218, related to a new access road to the Hugh K. Leatherman Sr. Terminal; the interchange was opened on February 23, 2021.

On October 18, 2018, SCDOT approved widening I-26 between Columbia and Charleston. SCDOT plans to widen I-26 from Old Sandy Run Road in Calhoun County to Ridgeville Road (SC 27) in Berkeley County.

Future

I-20/I-126 interchange 
The South Carolina Department of Transportation (SCDOT), in cooperation with the Federal Highway Administration (FHWA), is proposing improvements to the Interstate corridor of I-20/I-26/I-126, including the system interchanges at I-20/I-26 and I-26/I-126 in Lexington and Richland Counties. These improvements are proposed to increase mobility and enhance traffic operations by reducing existing traffic congestion within the I-20/I-26/I-126 corridor, while accommodating future traffic needs.

Auxiliary routes
I-26 in South Carolina has two extant and one former auxiliary route. I-126 in Columbia and I-526 in Charleston are spur routes in their respective cities. I-326 was an unsigned designation that was decommissioned and is now part of I-77 in Columbia.

Exit list

See also

 Ashley River
 Enoree River
 Lake Murray
 Saluda River
 Sumter National Forest

References

External links

 
 Mapmikey's South Carolina Highways Page: I-26
 Economic Development History of Interstate 26 in South Carolina - Federal Highway Administration

26
 South Carolina
Transportation in Spartanburg County, South Carolina
Transportation in Laurens County, South Carolina
Transportation in Newberry County, South Carolina
Transportation in Lexington County, South Carolina
Transportation in Richland County, South Carolina
Transportation in Calhoun County, South Carolina
Transportation in Orangeburg County, South Carolina
Transportation in Dorchester County, South Carolina
Transportation in Berkeley County, South Carolina
Transportation in Charleston County, South Carolina